Skelly may refer to:

People
Skelly (surname)
Skelly Alvero (born 2002), French footballer
Sam McCrory (loyalist) (1965–2022), Northern Ireland paramilitary member and gay activist nicknamed "Skelly"
J. Skelly Wright (1911–1988), United States circuit judge

Fictional characters
Skelly, a character in the video game Chrono Cross
Skelly, a character in the video game I Spy Spooky Mansion
Skelly, a character in the video game Hades

Other uses
Skelly Oil, a defunct oil company
Skellytown, Texas, a town originally named Skelly after the founder of Skelly Oil
Skelly Peak, Antarctica
Skelly Field at H. A. Chapman Stadium, at University of Tulsa, Oklahoma, U.S.

See also

Skelley (disambiguation)
Skellyville, Kansas
Skully (game), a children's game